Giancarlo Magalli (born 5 July 1947) is an Italian television writer, presenter, actor and voice actor.

Life and career 
Born in Rome, Magalli studied at the Istituto Massimiliano Massimo, having Mario Draghi and Luca Cordero di Montezemolo as classmates.

He started his artistic career as an entertainer in the first Italian tourist village at the end of the 1960s.  In the seventies he became collaborator of Pippo Franco, writing his monologues. He was contracted as a television writer by RAI in 1977.

In 1985, Magalli debuted as a television presenter with the Rai Uno TV-quiz Pronto chi gioca?. He later hosted several successful TV-programs, including Fantastico, I fatti vostri and  Domenica in.

For seven years Magalli has done volunteer work with the municipal police of Rome, of which he is honorary agent, going on patrol two nights a week, receiving the degree of sergeant, then to lieutenant and captain. He is also an honorary carabiniere.

In April 2007, Magalli was appointed Commendatore of the Italian Republic. In January 2015, he ranked first in an Il Fatto Quotidiano  poll resulting the preferred candidate to be the successor of Giorgio Napolitano as President of the Italian Republic.

Giancarlo Magalli has married two times and has two daughters; he considers himself Roman Catholic although dubious.

Controversy 
In 2017, he was involved in a live controversy with I fatti vostri co-host Adriana Volpe, who had revealed that Magalli was going to be 70 that year. The immediate reply "Pijatela in saccoccia te e quelli che non dicono l'età che c'hai te!" (Roman dialect for "Go getting shafted, you and all those not saying how old you are!") caused huge media coverage, eventually leading Striscia la notizia reporter Valerio Staffelli to award Magalli with a Tapiro d'oro. Later Volpe sued Magalli after he had made further allegations about her career, entailing a trial in Milan. In December 2021, Magalli was convicted of aggravated libel and condemned to pay €25.000 as damage refund to Volpe and €14.000 as fine.

On 7 July 2020, Magalli posted an image accompanied by the inscription "0.9%" and a shushing face emoji on Facebook. Apparently, the host was referring to Volpe's poor TV broadcast audience share. The post was quickly removed, but it had already led to huge controversy. The following day, Volpe opened her broadcast stating: "Dear Giancarlo, don't you dare make this gesture [the one the shushing face emoji represents] to me, cause you've been trying to shut me up for many years, but you never managed to do that and you won't do that today either. (...) And you, Giancarlo, with this gesture, always willing to shut up people, you show no respect to people and you show no respect to women. And I won't let you do that!"

In November 2021, while hosting the quiz game Una parola di troppo, Magalli refused to pronounce the word "volpe" (Italian for "fox"), as it recalled Adriana Volpe's surname. After the contestants did not guess the solution to the game, he said: "I can't even think about which word is the solution, but we must say it. Yet it's that word exactly! Ok, that word exactly. You should have said it, but you didn't."

References

External links 

1947 births
Living people
Carabinieri
Italian television presenters
Italian television writers
Italian male film actors
Italian male television actors
Italian male voice actors
Male television writers
Writers from Rome
Italian male screenwriters
Commanders of the Order of Merit of the Italian Republic
Italian Roman Catholics